After the Wreck, I Picked Myself Up, Spread My Wings, and Flew Away is a young adult novel written by Joyce Carol Oates. First published in 2006, it is her fifth novel for teenagers.

Plot summary
Jenna Abbott nearly dies in the car wreck on the bridge that took her mother's life. Broken in body and spirit, she feels lost and alone. She longs for the peace of the "blue" – the drug-filled haze she experienced in hospital – and steals drugs from her uncle's medicine cabinet, setting off on a self-destructive path.

Her classmate, the mysterious biker Crow, is the one person she can confide in about her misery and guilt.

Reception
Critical reception for the book has been positive, with the School Library Journal praising the book's print and audio forms, calling it "powerful". Commonsensemedia wrote that After the Wreck was a "raw look at loss & addiction best for older teens". Kirkus Reviews wrote that the book's ending was "wrapped up a bit too simply considering all of Jenna’s issues" but that "Oates’s variation on a stream-of-consciousness style is appropriate for the voice of a character who spends so much time in her own head". Booklist stated "There is too much going on, with everything spelled out, including the metaphor of her need to cross over the treacherous bridge. But Oates gets the contemporary teen voice just right, and Jenna's first-person narrative moves at breakneck speed." Publishers Weekly called the book "intense", saying it had an "inspiring conclusion".

References

External links
Celestial Timepiece: The Joyce Carol Oates Home Page – Joyce Carol Oates's official web site

Novels by Joyce Carol Oates
American young adult novels
2006 American novels

HarperCollins books
2006 children's books